The Foreign Affairs Committee is a standing committee of the Icelandic parliament.

Jurisdiction 

According to law № 55/1991, with later amendments, all matters relating to the following subjects are referred to the Foreign Affairs Committee:

 External communication
 International organisations
 Defence
 Security
 Export
 European Economic Area (EEA)
 Development aid
 International and global affairs

Members, 140th parliament 

The main members have seats in the committees and attend the meetings. When they are unable to do so the substitute members temporarily take their place.

Main

Substitute

See also 

 List of standing committees of the Icelandic parliament

External links 

  
  

Standing committees of the Icelandic parliament